The Fred Biletnikoff Award is presented annually to the most outstanding receiver in American college football by the Tallahassee Quarterback Club Foundation, Inc. (TQCF), an independent not-for-profit 501(c)(3) organization. The award was created by the Tallahassee Quarterback Club Foundation, Inc. in 1994. The award is named for Fred Biletnikoff, who played college football at Florida State University and professionally with the Oakland Raiders. Any NCAA Division I FBS player who catches the football through the forward pass is eligible to be selected as the award winner, although every winner thus far has been a wide receiver. A national selection committee consisting of over 630 journalists, commentators, broadcasters, and former players selects the award winner. No member of the board of trustees of the foundation has a vote. The foundation's charitable mission is provision of scholarships to North Florida high school seniors who have overcome significant challenges to achieve at the highest levels, with 300 scholarships having been awarded through 2022 with total benefits of 4.6 million dollars. Founding Trustee and Past Chairman Walter Manley II & Chairman Mark Ryan announced in December, 2022, the goal of 10 million dollars in aggregate to be awarded by 2030.

Winners

References
General
 
Footnotes

External links
 
 Scholarships:https://biletnikoffaward.com/about-scholarships/
 National Selection Committee: https://biletnikoffaward.com/voters/
 Candidate Eligibility, Watch List Inclusion & Voting Criteria: https://biletnikoffaward.com/criteria/
 2019 Banquet: https://biletnikoffaward.com/2019-banquet-video/
 2021 Banquet: https://biletnikoffaward.com/2021-banquet-video/

College football national player awards
Awards established in 1994
1994 establishments in Florida